Sagotia is a genus of plants under the family Euphorbiaceae first described as a genus in 1860. It is native to northern South America.

Species
Sagotia brachysepala (Müll.Arg.) Secco - French Guinea, Suriname, Guyana, Venezuela, Colombia, Brazil 
Sagotia racemosa Baill. - French Guinea, Suriname, Guyana, Venezuela, Colombia, Ecuador, Brazil; possibly Panama + Costa Rica

Formerly included
moved to Morierina (Rubiaceae)
Sagotia gardenioides - Morierina montana (Rubiaceae)

Names in homonym genus
In 1851, Duchassaing & Walpers used the same generic name, Sagotia, to refer to a very different plant. Ordinarily, the rules of nomenclature mandate that the older name should be considered legitimate, while the newer one would need to be abandoned. In this case, however, the decision was made to conserve the newer name and reject the older one. Thus the one name in the older name was changed as follows:
Sagotia triflora (L.) Duchass. & Walp. - Desmodium triflorum (L.) DC.

References

Codiaeae
Flora of South America
Euphorbiaceae genera
Taxa named by Henri Ernest Baillon